The 2022 Preston City Council election is currently taking place as of 5 May 2022 to elect members of Preston City Council. happened on the same day as other local elections.

Council elections for the Preston City Council were last held in 2021 as part of the 2021 United Kingdom local elections. The council underwent a wholesale boundary revision in 2020, reducing the number of both Councillors and electoral wards, resulting in the first 'all out' election since 2002 Preston Council election.

All locally registered electors (British, Irish, Commonwealth and European Union citizens) who are aged 18 or over on polling day are entitled to vote in the local elections.

Council composition
Prior to the election the composition of the council is:

Labour Party: 28
Conservative Party: 11
Liberal Democrats: 7
Independent: 1
Vacant: 1

Results summary

Ward results

Ashton

Brookfield

Cadley

City Centre

Deepdale

Fishwick and Frenchwood

Garrison

Greyfriars

Ingol and Cottam

Lea and Larches

Plungington

Preston Rural East

Preston Rural North

Ribbleton

Sharoe Green

St. Matthew's

References 

Preston City Council elections
Preston
2020s in Lancashire